Janker may refer to:

Christoph Janker, German soccer player
Josef W. Janker, German author
Jankers, vernacular term for minor punishments within the British Armed Forces
Janker (jacket), a traditional item of clothing in much of southern Germany, Switzerland, Austria and northern Italy